Kissin' Cousins (stylized onscreen as KISƧIN' COUSINS) is a 1964 American musical Panavision Metrocolor comedy film directed by Gene Nelson and starring Elvis Presley. Written by Gerald Drayson Adams and Gene Nelson, the film featured Presley playing two roles: an Air Force officer, with dark hair, and his look-alike hillbilly distant cousin, with blond hair.

Plot
The U.S. Federal Government has run into a dead end trying to negotiate the lease of mountaintop land owned by Pappy Tatum, in the Great Smoky Mountains of Tennessee, for use as an ICBM missile base. U.S. Army General Alvin Donford gives Captain Robert Salbo seven days to secure the lease, or face permanent assignment to Greenland. After a quick computer search of military records, Salbo requests that U.S. Air Force pilot Second Lt. Josh Morgan, born elsewhere in the Great Smoky Mountains, be assigned as his number two. When they arrive in Tennessee with a small platoon, dark-haired Josh is surprised to meet his look-alike third cousin Jodie Tatum, a blond hillbilly.

Josh also meets his two beautiful country cousins, Azalea and Selena, who compete to win his affections. Josh eventually chooses Azalea and pairs off Selena with his friend, Master Sgt. William Bailey. Jodie, on the other hand, falls for Private Midge Riley, a beautiful but fiery soldier. There are also a group of 13 mountain maidens called the Kittyhawks who create havoc when they set their sights on the marriage-eligible soldiers.

Josh persuades Pappy Tatum to lease the mountaintop to the government for a monthly payment of $1,000 ($ today) as long as an access road is built from the far side and the military provide security to prevent government employees from accessing Tatum's side – which will prevent "revenoors" from interfering with Pappy's moonshining.

Cast
 Elvis Presley as Josh Morgan / Jodie Tatum
 Arthur O'Connell as Pappy Tatum
 Glenda Farrell as Ma Tatum
 Jack Albertson as Captain Robert Salbo 
 Pamela Austin as Selena Tatum
 Cynthia Pepper as Midge (a WAC PFC)
 Yvonne Craig as Azalea Tatum
 Donald Woods as General Alvin Donford
 Tommy Farrell as Master Sgt. William George Bailey
 Beverly Powers as Trudy (a Kittyhawk)
 Hortense Petra as Dixie (a newspaper reporter)
 Robert Stone as General's Aide

Production, release and box office
While set in the Great Smoky Mountains, the film was shot in the Los Angeles area, both on set at MGM Studios and outdoors in the San Bernardino Mountains east of Los Angeles; some filming took place in Big Bear Lake.
The film was produced by Sam Katzman for Four-Leaf Productions, and was distributed in the United States by Metro-Goldwyn-Mayer. The film was released in the United States on March 6, 1964 and reached #11 on the Variety National Box Office Chart, earning $3 million, and finished at #26 on the year end list of the top-grossing movies of 1964. Presley's film, Viva Las Vegas, filmed during the summer of 1963 before Kissin Cousins, was released after Kissin' Cousins. Both Arthur O'Connell and Jack Albertson were cast alongside Presley, thus providing the film with 'double-barreled curmudgeons,' per Variety.

Sam Katzman produced an unsuccessful 1965 MGM Television television pilot starring Edd Byrnes for the NBC television network.

In 1988, Kissin' Cousins made its home video debut, released on VHS. When it was reissued on VHS in 1997, the song "Smokey Mountain Boy" was deleted. It was later restored to the film when it made its DVD debut in 2007.

Soundtrack

The song "Kissin' Cousins", which was performed as the movie's finale, reached #12 on the Billboard Hot 100 and was certified Gold by the RIAA.

Plot faux pas

The foundation for the film's plot centers around acquiring private land for government use. This is easily accomplished through the necessary justification of eminent domain with just compensation due to the private sector owner(s).  But, as General Donford's initial desire—clearly expressed at the start of the film—was for the deal for the base to remain top secret, it could be somewhat plausibly surmised that usage of eminent domain might have led to wide-ranging publicity from negotiations in open court.  A point that became moot after the story became front-page news shortly after PFC Riley joined the field team at Big Smoky Mountain.

Reception
Howard Thompson of The New York Times wrote, "With the flavor of 'Fun in Acapulco'—and that it was—fairly fresh, Elvis Presley's movie status takes a nosedive in his latest, 'Kissin' Cousins' ... Sam Katzman's production is tired, strained and familiar stuff, even with double-barreled Presley." Variety wrote, ""This new Elvis Presley concoction is a pretty dreary effort, one that certainly won't replenish the popularity of Sir Swivel. Presley needs — and merits — more substantial material than this if his career is to continue to flourish as in the past." One of the review's primary criticisms was "the business of bursting into song out of context in the middle of a scene. This used to be reasonably acceptable to audiences, but now it is beginning to evolve into an anachronism." Margaret Harford in the Los Angeles Times called the film "a frisky mixture of 'Seven Brides for Seven Brothers' and 'Li'l Abner.' You get your money's worth before monotony sets in as it does in nearly all the Presley pictures." The Monthly Film Bulletin wrote, "Presley films of only two or three years back set high standards of humour, characterisation and pictorial attractiveness. With its tired hillbilly jokes, dance routines reminiscent of Li'l Abner, over-acting and straggling plot, this is a poor successor to comedies like Follow That Dream. The effort into presenting Presley in two roles in the same shot, and even fighting 'himself', seems strangely wasted, so little importance does the similarity of Josh and Jodie have in the story."

Awards and nominations
Screenwriters Gene Nelson and Gerald Drayson Adams were nominated for the Writers Guild of America Award in the category of Best Written American Musical (won by Mary Poppins).

See also
List of American films of 1964

References

External links
 
 
 
 Kissin' Cousins at Elvis Presley's Movies
 Kissin' Cousins at DVDTalk

1964 films
1964 musical comedy films
1964 romantic comedy films
American musical comedy films
American romantic comedy films
Films set in Tennessee
Films shot in Big Bear Lake, California
Films shot in Los Angeles
Metro-Goldwyn-Mayer films
1960s English-language films
American romantic musical films
Films directed by Gene Nelson
1960s American films
Films about hillbillies